This is a sortable table of the approximately 1,090 townlands in County Dublin, Ireland.

Duplicate names or entries can occur where there is more than one townland with the same name in the county, where a townland crosses a Barony boundary e.g. Roebuck, or sometimes when a townland has an alternate name e.g. Trimleston / Owenstown. Names marked in bold typeface are towns and villages, and the word Town appears for those entries in the Acres column.

Townland list

References

 
Dublin
Dublin
Townlands